Kazakhstan competed at the 2006 Asian Games, held in Doha, Qatar, from December 1 to 15, 2006 and ranked 4th with 23 gold medals.

References

Nations at the 2006 Asian Games
2006
Asian Games